Hòa Thành is a town of Tây Ninh Province in the Southeast region of Vietnam. It is located in the centre of the province. As of 2003, the district had a population of 146,400. The district covers an area of 82 km². The district capital lies at Hòa Thành, which is located on National Route 22B, 8 km southeast of Tây Ninh City.

The district is bordered to the north by Tây Ninh City, to the west by Châu Thành District, to the southeast by Gò Dầu and to the northeast by Dương Minh Châu District.

Communes
The district seat aside there are several communes in Hòa Thành
 Hiệp Tân
 Long Thành Bắc
 Long Thành Trung
 Long Thành Nam
 Trường Đông
 Trường Hòa
 Trường Tây

The Long Hoa market in the district is a centre of commerce as the district is located on a highway from Ho Chi Minh City to Tây Ninh, which extends into Cambodia and is the main trade route to Phnom Penh and beyond to Thailand. There is also an ornate Cao Đài temple; this province is the home of this 20th-century religion. The Moon Festival celebrations in the district attract 30,000 people on an annual basis and is well known in the region.

References

Districts of Tây Ninh province
County-level towns in Vietnam